The Grammy Award for Best Vocal Arrangement for Two or More Voices was awarded from 1977 to 1986.  From 1977 to 1981 it was called the Grammy Award for Best Arrangement for Voices.  The award is presented to the arranger of the music.

Years reflect the year in which the Grammy Awards were presented, for works released in the previous year.

Winners and nominees

References

 
Vocal Arrangement for Two or More Voices